Michael Thomas Fiore (born May 4, 1966) is an American amateur and professional baseball player. An outfielder, first baseman, third baseman, and designated hitter, he batted from the right side and threw with his right hand.

Baseball career

Amateur
Fiore played college baseball for the University of Miami from 1985 to 1988. He was a key contributor to their victory in the 1985 College World Series, and was the school's lone representative on the All-Tournament team at the 1986 College World Series, where Miami was eliminated in the 14th game. The next year, he was the inaugural winner of the Dick Howser Trophy  He was ultimately inducted into the University of Miami Sports Hall of Fame.

He won a silver medal as a member of the United States national baseball team at the 1987 Pan American Games and remained a member of the national team in 1988, representing the United States at the 1988 Summer Olympics, where America won a gold medal (unofficial due to the competition's status as a demonstration sport), and the 1988 Baseball World Cup, where he won a silver medal and was recognized as the designated hitter on the tournament's All Star Team.

Fiore was also one of nine finalists for the Golden Spikes Award that year, which was awarded to Robin Ventura of Oklahoma State University.

Mike was inducted into the University of Miami Sports Hall of Fame in 2000.

Professional
The St. Louis Cardinals selected Fiore in the 15th round of the 1988 Major League Baseball Draft, but he never reached the major leagues. He played for the class A Springfield Cardinals in 1989, the advanced class A St. Petersburg Cardinals in 1990, and the class AA Arkansas Travelers in 1991.

Post-playing career
After his retirement as a player, he worked for USA Baseball, eventually advancing to the position of general manager. He later joined the staff of sports agent Scott Boras, who had been Fiore's representative during his playing career.

References

External links
 

1966 births
Living people
Arkansas Travelers players
Baseball players at the 1988 Summer Olympics
Olympic gold medalists for the United States in baseball
Miami Hurricanes baseball players
Springfield Cardinals players
St. Petersburg Cardinals players
Sportspeople from Atlantic City, New Jersey
Medalists at the 1988 Summer Olympics
Baseball players at the 1987 Pan American Games
Pan American Games silver medalists for the United States
Pan American Games medalists in baseball
Baseball players from New Jersey
All-American college baseball players
National College Baseball Hall of Fame inductees
Medalists at the 1987 Pan American Games